Lucy María del Carmen Jaramillo Ogonaga (born 23 February 1983 in San Vicente de Pusir, Carchi) is an Ecuadorian hurdler. At the 2012 Summer Olympics, she competed in the Women's 400 metres hurdles.

Personal bests
400 m: 53.15 s A –  Cuenca, 31 May 2012
800 m: 2:08.77 min –  Cali, 24 July 2005
100 m hurdles: 14.65 s A (wind: -0.9 m/s) –  Cuenca, 6 June 2008
400 m hurdles: 56.50 s NR –  Cali, 24 June 2012

Competition record

References

External links
 

1983 births
Living people
People from Bolívar Canton, Carchi
Ecuadorian female hurdlers
Olympic athletes of Ecuador
Athletes (track and field) at the 2012 Summer Olympics
Athletes (track and field) at the 2007 Pan American Games
Athletes (track and field) at the 2011 Pan American Games
Ecuadorian sportswomen
Pan American Games medalists in athletics (track and field)
Pan American Games silver medalists for Ecuador
South American Games silver medalists for Ecuador
South American Games medalists in athletics
Competitors at the 2002 South American Games
Competitors at the 2007 Summer Universiade
Medalists at the 2011 Pan American Games
21st-century Ecuadorian women